Keller's 10 is a ten-strong Swiss band, led by composer and conductor Beat Keller.  Their music can be classed as jazz, avant-garde, experimental, rock, New Orleans jazz, ambient and manic polka.

History 
The band was founded in 2006 by Winterthur-based guitar player, multi-instrumentalist and composer Beat Keller. In 2008 they released their debut album, which was widely acclaimed within the jazz community. The well renowned jazz site All About Jazz picked the album as the «Best Debut Release 2008». In 2013 the band released their second studio album called Two.

Discography 
 Keller’s 10 (2008) Unit Records
 Two (2013) Unit Records

References

External links
 Keller’s 10 official website
 Beat Keller’s official website
 

Swiss jazz ensembles